Am Bàthach is a Scottish mountain situated at the head of Glen Shiel, at the western end of Loch Cluanie some  south east of Kyle of Lochalsh.

Overview
Am Bàthach reaches a height of 798 metres (2,618 feet) and is a lone Corbett surrounded by considerably higher Munros. Its grassy slopes are in marked contrast to the rockier peaks of the other Glen Shiel hills. it is often climbed along with the adjoining Munro of Ciste Dhubh with the route over Am Bàthach providing a more interesting and drier route to the Munro than the boggy An Caorann Beag glen. The hill offers an interesting half day walk when ascended on its own and it is frequently the only one of the Kintail mountains in the clear when weather conditions are poor. Am Bàthach's roof like shape made up of a long NE-SW ridge with steep sides is alleged to resemble a cow shed or a byre and that is the meaning of its translated name, a throwback to the time when cattle where a prominent feature of the Scottish Highlands.

Geography
The steep slopes on either side of the mountain drop down to the valleys of the An Caorann Beag on its west side and the An Caorann Mòr on the eastern flanks, both these hillsides are seamed with numerous small streams. The southern ridge of Am Bàthach descends to the A87 road as it passes along the northern shore of Loch Cluanie and has been planted with coniferous woodland on its lower slopes, this plantation is an outlying eastern section of the Glenshiel Forest.

The pass, which lives up to its name connects to the two Munros of Ciste Dhubh and Aonach Meadhoin and has a small lochan lying on it. Am Bàthach is drained by the Allt a’ Chaorainn Bhig and the Allt a’ Chaorainn Mhòir, the two burns which flow down the glens to the east and west of the hill. They flow to Loch Cluanie and reach the east coast of Scotland at the Moray Firth, some  distant, via Glenmoriston and Loch Ness.

Ascents
There is really only one route of ascent for Am Bàthach, this is the climb from the A87 road to the south. The only alternative is passing over the hill when descending from the Munro of Ciste Dhubh. The route from the A87 starts at the car park next to the Cluanie Inn (grid reference ). From here the southern ridge of Am Bàthach can be accessed by walking east for  along the A87 and then following an old stalkers path which leaves the road and goes to the right of the plantation to climb the southern ridge of the mountain to the summit. The summit is a good place to admire the surrounding Munros of Kintail. Loch Cluanie is well seen to the south and the Cluanie Inn is in view at its west end.

References
The Corbetts and Other Scottish Hills, Scott Johnstone (Editor) et al., 
100 Best Routes on Scottish Mountains, Ralph Storer, 
The Call of the Corbetts, Irvine Butterfield, 
Climbing the Corbetts, Hamish Brown, 
Footnotes

Corbetts
Marilyns of Scotland
Mountains and hills of the Northwest Highlands